Abdellah Ez Zine is a paralympic athlete from Morocco competing mainly in category T52 sprint and middle-distance events.

Abdellah competed in the 200m and 400m in the 2004 Summer Paralympics where he also won a gold medal in the T52 800m.

References

Paralympic athletes of Morocco
Athletes (track and field) at the 2004 Summer Paralympics
Paralympic gold medalists for Morocco
Living people
Medalists at the 2004 Summer Paralympics
Year of birth missing (living people)
Paralympic medalists in athletics (track and field)
Moroccan male sprinters
Moroccan male middle-distance runners